Western India Regional Council, abbreviated as WIRC of ICAI is one of the five Regional Councils of Institute of Chartered Accountants of India (ICAI) and the largest among them. It is located in Mumbai and serves a membership of more than 85000 Chartered Accountants and circa 225000 CA students, in a network of 32 branches in the three states of Maharashtra, Gujarat, Goa and two Union Territories of Daman and Diu and Dadra and Nagar Haveli.

Branches
In all, WIRC has 32 branches, with the recent most Kalyan-Dombivli branch being formed on 17 January 2016. The main regional office of WIRC is located at Mumbai in Maharashtra.

Maharashtra
Akola
Ahmednagar (Est. 2002)
Amravati (Est. 27 March 2008)
Aurangabad (Est. 17 June 1986)
Dhule (Est. 1 June 2013)
Kalyan-Dombivali (Est. 17 January 2016
Jalgaon
Kolhapur
Latur
Nagpur
Nanded
Nashik
Navi Mumbai
Pimpri-Chinchwad
Bandra Kurla Complex (Est. 27 March 2008)
Pune
Sangli
Solapur
Thane
Vasai

Gujarat
Ahmedabad
Anand
Bharuch
Baroda
Bhavnagar
Bhuj
Gandhidham
Jamnagar
Navsari
Rajkot
Surat
Vapi

Goa
Goa

Regional Council members
Following is the list of members of WIRC elected for the years 2019-2021
 CA. Lalit Bajaj - Chairman
 CA. Vishal P. Doshi - Vice Chairman
 CA. Murtuza Kachwala - Secretary
 CA. Jayesh Kala - Treasurer
 CA. Hitesh Pomal - Chairman [WICASA]
 CA. Abhijit Kelkar 
 CA. Anand Jakhotiya 
 CA. Arpit Kabra 
 CA. Arun Anandagiri 
 CA. Balkishan Agarwal 
 CA. Chintan Patel 
 CA. Drushti Desai 
 CA. Hitesh Pomal 
 CA. Kamlesh Saboo  
 CA. Manish Gadia 
 CA. Murtuza Kachwala 
 CA. Shilpa Shinagare 
 CA. Sushrut Chitale 
 CA. Vikash Jain
 CA. Vimal Agrawal
 CA. Vishal P. Doshi

Students' Council
The students' wing of WIRC is Western India Chartered Accountants Students Association (WICASA). The managing committee consists of 12 members who are Chartered Accountancy course students, pursuing their articleship. Apart from this Committee at regional level, there are separate WICASA Committees at Branch level which are again managed by Chartered  Accountancy Students pursuing 'articleship'
The Managing Committee at Branch level consists of 7 members.

References

External links
 Official Website - wirc-icai.org

Organisations based in Mumbai
Professional accounting bodies
Professional associations based in India
Accounting in India
Organizations with year of establishment missing